

Events

January

 January 1 – Canada begins a year-long celebration of the 100th anniversary of Confederation, featuring the Expo 67 World's Fair.
 January 5
 Spain and Romania sign an agreement in Paris, establishing full consular and commercial relations (not diplomatic ones).
 Charlie Chaplin launches his last film, A Countess from Hong Kong, in the UK.
 January 6 – Vietnam War: USMC and ARVN troops launch Operation Deckhouse Five in the Mekong Delta.
 January 8 – Vietnam War: Operation Cedar Falls starts.
 January 13 – A military coup occurs in Togo under the leadership of Étienne Eyadema.
 January 14 – The Human Be-In takes place in Golden Gate Park, San Francisco; the event sets the stage for the Summer of Love.
 January 15
 Louis Leakey announces the discovery of pre-human fossils in Kenya; he names the species Kenyapithecus africanus.
 American football: The Green Bay Packers defeat the Kansas City Chiefs 35–10 in the First AFL-NFL World Championship Game at the Los Angeles Memorial Coliseum.
 January 18 – Albert DeSalvo is convicted of numerous crimes and sentenced to life in prison.
 January 23
 In Munich, the trial begins for Wilhelm Harster, accused of the murder of 82,856 Jews (including Anne Frank) when he led German security police during the German occupation of the Netherlands. He is eventually sentenced to 15 years in prison.
 Milton Keynes (England) is founded as a new town by Order in Council, with a planning brief to become a city of 250,000 people. Its initial designated area enclosed three existing towns and twenty one villages. The area to be developed was largely farmland, with evidence of permanent settlement dating back to the Bronze Age.
January 25 – South Vietnamese junta leader and Prime Minister Nguyen Cao Ky fired rival, Deputy Prime Minister and Defence Minister Nguyen Huu Co while the latter was overseas on a diplomatic visit.
 January 26
 The Parliament of the United Kingdom decides to nationalise 90% of the nation's steel industry.
 Chicago's largest-ever blizzard begins.
 January 27
 Apollo 1: U.S. astronauts Gus Grissom, Ed White, and Roger Chaffee are killed when fire breaks out in their Apollo spacecraft during a launch pad test.
 The United States, Soviet Union and United Kingdom sign the Outer Space Treaty (ratified by USSR May 19; comes into force October 10), prohibiting weapons of mass destruction from space.
 January 31 – West Germany and Romania establish diplomatic relations.

February

 February 2 – The American Basketball Association is formed.
 February 3 – Ronald Ryan becomes the last man hanged in Australia, for murdering a guard while escaping from prison in December 1965.
 February 4 – The Soviet Union protests the demonstrations before its embassy in Beijing.
 February 5
 NASA launches Lunar Orbiter 3.
 Italy's first guided missile cruiser, the Vittorio Veneto, is launched.
 General Anastasio Somoza Debayle becomes president of Nicaragua.
 February 6 – Alexei Kosygin arrives in the UK for an 8-day visit. He meets The Queen on February 9.
 February 7
 The Chinese government announces that it can no longer guarantee the safety of Soviet diplomats outside the Soviet Embassy building.
 Serious bushfires in southern Tasmania claim 62 lives and destroy 2,642.7 square kilometres (653,025.4 acres) of land.
 Mazenod College, Victoria, opens in Australia.
 February 10 – The 25th Amendment to the United States Constitution (presidential succession and disability) is ratified.
 February 11 – Burgess Ice Rise, lying off the west coast of Alexander Island, Antarctica, is first mapped by the British Antarctic Survey (BAS).
 February 13 – American researchers discover the Madrid Codices by Leonardo da Vinci in the National Library of Spain.
 February 15 – The Soviet Union announces that it has sent troops near the Chinese border.
 February 18 – New Orleans District Attorney Jim Garrison claims he will solve the John F. Kennedy assassination, and that a conspiracy was planned in New Orleans.
 February 22
 Suharto takes power from Sukarno in Indonesia (see Transition to the New Order and Supersemar).
 Donald Sangster becomes the new Prime Minister of Jamaica, succeeding Alexander Bustamante.
 February 23
 Trinidad and Tobago is the first Commonwealth nation to join the Organization of American States.
 The 25th Amendment to the United States Constitution is enacted.
 February 24 – Moscow forbids its satellite states to form diplomatic relations with West Germany.
 February 25
 The Chinese government announces that it has ordered the army to help in the spring seeding.
 Britain's second Polaris missile submarine, HMS Renown, is launched.
 February 26 – A Soviet nuclear test is conducted at the Semipalatinsk Test Site, Eastern Kazakhstan.
 February 27 – The Dutch government supports British EEC membership.

March

 March 1
 The city of Hatogaya, Saitama, Japan, is founded.
 Brazilian police arrest Franz Stangl, ex-commander of Treblinka and Sobibór extermination camps.
 The Red Guards return to schools in China.
 The Queen Elizabeth Hall is opened in London.
 Óscar Gestido is sworn in as President of Uruguay after 15 years of collegiate government.
 March 4
 The first North Sea gas is pumped ashore at Easington, East Riding of Yorkshire.
 Queens Park Rangers become the first 3rd Division side to win the English Football League Cup at Wembley Stadium, defeating West Bromwich Albion 3–2.
 March 5 – Mohammad Mosaddegh (or Mosaddeq;), deposed Iranian prime minister, dies after fourteen years of house arrest.
 March 6 – Mark Twain Tonight, starring Hal Holbrook as Mark Twain, premieres on CBS television in the United States.
 March 7 – U.S. labor union leader Jimmy Hoffa begins his 8-year sentence for attempting to bribe a jury.
 March 9 – Joseph Stalin's daughter, Svetlana Alliluyeva, defects to the United States via the U.S. Embassy in New Delhi.
 March 11 – The first phase of the Cambodian Civil War begins between the Kingdom of Cambodia and the Khmer Rouge.
 March 12
 The Indonesian State Assembly takes all presidential powers from Sukarno and names Suharto as acting president (Suharto resigned in 1998).
 The Velvet Underground's first album, The Velvet Underground & Nico, is released in the United States. It is initially a commercial failure but receives widespread critical and commercial acclaim in later years.
 March 13 – Moise Tshombe, ex-prime minister of Congo, is sentenced to death in absentia.
 March 14
 The body of U.S. President John F. Kennedy is moved to a permanent burial place at Arlington National Cemetery.
 Nine executives of the German pharmaceutical company Grunenthal are charged for breaking German drug laws because of thalidomide.
 March 16 – In the Aspida case in Greece, 15 officers are sentenced to 2–18 years in prison, accused of treason and intentions of staging a coup.
 March 17 – The Grateful Dead debut their first album The Grateful Dead.
 March 18
 Torrey Canyon oil spill: The supertanker  runs aground between Land's End and the Scilly Isles off the coast of Britain.
 The classic Pirates of the Caribbean attraction opens at Disneyland, California.
 March 19 – A referendum in French Somaliland favors the connection to France.
 March 21
 A military coup takes place in Sierra Leone.
 Vietnam War: In ongoing campus unrest, Howard University students protesting the Vietnam War, the ROTC program on campus and the draft, confront Gen. Lewis Hershey, then head of the U.S. Selective Service System, and as he attempts to deliver an address, shout him down with cries of "America is the Black man's battleground!"
 Charles Manson is released from Terminal Island. Telling the authorities that prison had become his home, he requested permission to stay. Upon his release, he relocates to San Francisco where he spends the Summer of Love.
 March 26
 In New York City, 10,000 gather for the Central Park be-in.
 Jim Thompson, co-founder of the Thai Silk Company, disappears from the Cameron Highlands.
 March 28 – Pope Paul VI issues the encyclical Populorum progressio.
 March 29
 A 13-day TV strike begins in the United States.
 The first French nuclear submarine, Le Redoutable, is launched.
 The SEACOM Asian telephone cable is inaugurated.
 Torrey Canyon oil spill: British Fleet Air Arm and Royal Air Force aircraft bomb and sink the grounded supertanker .
 March 31 – U.S. President Lyndon Johnson signs the Consular Treaty.

April

 April 1 – A new South Vietnamese constitution is adopted.
 April 2 – A United Nations delegation arrives in Aden as its independence approaches. The delegation leaves April 7, accusing British authorities of lack of cooperation. The British say the delegation did not contact them.
 April 4 – Martin Luther King Jr. denounces the Vietnam War during his sermon at the Riverside Church in New York City.
 April 6 – Georges Pompidou begins to form the next French government.
 April 7 – Six-Day War (approach): Israeli fighters shoot down 7 Syrian MIG-21s.
 April 8 – Puppet on a String by Sandie Shaw (music and lyrics by Bill Martin and Phil Coulter) wins the Eurovision Song Contest 1967 for the United Kingdom.
 April 9 – The first Boeing 737 (A-100 series) takes its maiden flight.
 April 10
 The AFTRA strike is settled just in time for the 39th Academy Awards ceremony to be held, hosted by Bob Hope. Best Picture goes to A Man for All Seasons.
 Oral arguments begin in the landmark Supreme Court of the United States case Loving v. Virginia, 388 U.S. 1 (1967), challenging the State of Virginia's statutory scheme to prevent marriages between persons solely on the basis of racial classifications.
 April 12 – The Ahmanson Theatre opens in Los Angeles.
 April 13 – Conservatives win the Greater London Council elections.
 April 14 – In San Francisco, 10,000 march against the Vietnam War.
 April 15
 Large demonstrations are held against the Vietnam War in New York City and San Francisco. The march, organized by the National Mobilization Committee to End the War in Vietnam, from Central Park to the United Nations drew hundreds of thousands of people, including Dr. Martin Luther King Jr., Harry Belafonte, James Bevel, and Dr. Benjamin Spock, who marched and spoke at the event. A simultaneous march in San Francisco was attended by Coretta Scott King.
 Scotland defeats England 3–2 at Wembley Stadium, with goals from Law, Lennox and McCalligog, in the British Championships. This is England's first defeat since they won the World Cup, and ends a 19-game unbeaten run.
 April 20
 The Surveyor 3 probe lands on the Moon.
 A Globe Air Bristol Britannia turboprop crashes at Nicosia, Cyprus, killing 126 people.
 April 21
 Greece suffers a military coup by a group of military officers, who establish a military dictatorship led by Georgios Papadopoulos; future-Prime Minister Andreas Papandreou remains a political prisoner till December 25. The dictatorship ends in 1974.
 An outbreak of tornadoes strikes the upper Midwest section of the United States (in particular the Chicago area, including the suburbs of Belvidere and Oak Lawn, Illinois where 33 people are killed and 500 injured).
 April 23 – A group of young leftist radicals are expelled from the Nicaraguan Socialist Party (PSN). This group goes on to found the Socialist Workers Party (POS).
 April 24
Soyuz 1: Vladimir Komarov becomes the first Soviet cosmonaut to die, when the parachute of his space capsule fails during re-entry.
 In the NBA, the Philadelphia 76ers defeat the San Francisco Warriors 125–122 in game six to win the title. Some say this team is arguably the greatest of all time.
 A total lunar eclipse took place.
 April 27 – Montreal, Quebec, Expo 67, a World's Fair to coincide with the Canadian Confederation centennial, officially opens with Prime Minister Lester B. Pearson igniting the Expo Flame in the Place des Nations.
 April 28
 In Houston, Texas, boxer Muhammad Ali refuses military service. He is stripped of his boxing title and barred from professional boxing for the next three years.
 Expo 67 opens to the public, with over 310,000 people attending. Al Carter from Chicago is the first visitor as noted by Expo officials.
 The U.S. aerospace manufacturer McDonnell Douglas is formed through a merger of McDonnell Aircraft and Douglas Aircraft (it becomes part of The Boeing Company three decades later).
 April 29 – Fidel Castro announces that all intellectual property belongs to the people and that Cuba intends to translate and publish technical literature without compensation.
 April 30 – Moscow's 537 m tall TV tower is finished.

May

 May 1
 Elvis Presley and Priscilla Beaulieu are married in Las Vegas.
 GO Transit, Canada's first interregional public transit system, is established.
 May 2
 The Toronto Maple Leafs win the Stanley Cup. It is their last Stanley Cup and last finals appearance to date. It will turn out to be the last game in the Original Six era. Six more teams will be added in the fall.
 Harold Wilson announces that the United Kingdom has decided to apply for EEC membership.
 May 4 – Lunar Orbiter 4 is launched by the United States.
 May 6
 Dr. Zakir Hussain is the first Muslim to become president of India.
 Four hundred students seize the administration building at Cheyney State College, now Cheyney University of Pennsylvania, the oldest institute for higher education for African Americans.
 Hong Kong 1967 riots: Clashes between striking workers and police kill 51 and injure 800.
 May 8 – The Philippine province of Davao is split into three: Davao del Norte, Davao del Sur, and Davao Oriental.
 May 9 – A partial solar eclipse took place.
 May 10 – The Greek military government accuses Andreas Papandreou of treason.
 May 11 – The United Kingdom and Ireland apply officially for European Economic Community membership.
 May 12 – The Jimi Hendrix Experience release their debut album, Are You Experienced.
 May 15 – The Waiting period leading up to the Six-Day War begins.
 May 17
 Syria mobilizes against Israel.
 President Gamal Abdal Nasser of Egypt demands withdrawal of the peacekeeping UN Emergency Force in the Sinai. U.N. Secretary-General U Thant complies (May 18).
 May 18
 Tennessee Governor Ellington repeals the "Monkey Law" (officially the Butler Act; see the Scopes Trial).
 In Mexico, schoolteacher Lucio Cabañas begins guerrilla warfare in Atoyac de Alvarez, west of Acapulco, in the state of Guerrero.
 NASA announces the crew for the Apollo 7 space mission (the first in the Apollo series with a crew): Wally Schirra, Donn F. Eisele, and R. Walter Cunningham.
 May 19 — Yuri Andropov becomes KGB chief in the Soviet Union.
 May 20 — The Spring Mobilization Conference, a gathering of 700 antiwar activists is held in Washington D.C. to chart the future moves for the U.S. antiwar movement
 May 22 – The Innovation department store in the centre of Brussels, Belgium, burns down. It is the most devastating fire in Belgian history, resulting in 323 dead and missing and 150 injured.
 May 23
 A significant worldwide geomagnetic flare unfolded. Radio emissions coming from the Sun jammed military surveillance radars.
 Egypt closes the Straits of Tiran to Israeli shipping, blockading Israel's southern port of Eilat, and Israel's entire Red Sea coastline.
 May 25
 Celtic F.C. becomes the first Northern European football club to win the European Cup (now Champions League). 
 May 26 – The Beatles release Sgt. Pepper's Lonely Hearts Club Band, nicknamed "The Soundtrack of the Summer of Love"; it will be number one on the albums charts throughout the summer of 1967.
 May 27
 Naxalite Guerrilla War: Beginning with a peasant uprising in the town of Naxalbari, this Marxist/Maoist rebellion sputters on in the Indian countryside. The guerrillas operate among the impoverished peasants, fighting both the government security forces and private paramilitary groups funded by wealthy landowners. Most fighting takes place in the states of Andhra Pradesh, Maharashtra, Odisha and Madhya Pradesh.
 The Australian referendum, 1967 passes with an overwhelming 90% support, removing, from the Australian Constitution, 2 discriminatory sentences referring to Indigenous Australians. It signifies Australia's first step in recognising Indigenous rights.
 The folk rock band Fairport Convention plays their first gig in Golders Green, North London.
 May 30 – Biafra, in eastern Nigeria, announces its independence, which is not recognized.

June

 June 2
 Protests in West Berlin against the arrival of the Shah of Iran turn into fights, during which 27-year-old student Benno Ohnesorg is killed by a police officer. His death results in the founding of the terrorist group 2 June Movement.
 Luis Monge is executed in Colorado's gas chamber, in the last pre-Furman execution in the United States.
 June 4 – Stockport air disaster: British Midland flight G-ALHG crashes in Hopes Carr, Stockport, killing 72 passengers and crew.
 June 5
 Moshe Dayan becomes Israel's Minister of Defense.
 Six-Day War begins: Israel launches Operation Focus, an attack on Egyptian Air Force airfields; the allied armies of Egypt, Syria, Iraq, and Jordan invade Israel. Battle of Ammunition Hill, start of the Jordanian campaign
 Murderer Richard Speck is sentenced to death in the electric chair for killing 8 student nurses in Chicago.
 June 7
 East Jerusalem is captured in a battle conducted by Israeli forces, without the use of artillery, in order to avoid damage to the Holy City.
 Two members of the American rock group Moby Grape are arrested for contributing to the delinquency of minors.
 June 8 
USS Liberty incident: A U.S. Navy ship is attacked by Israeli forces, apparently in error, killing 34 crew.
 Egypt severed diplomatic relations with the United States
 June 10
 Six-Day War ends: Israel and Syria agree to a United Nations-mediated cease-fire.
 The Soviet Union severs diplomatic relations with Israel.
 Margrethe, heir apparent to the throne of Denmark, marries French count Henri de Laborde de Monpezat.
 June 11 – A race riot occurs in Tampa, Florida after the shooting death of Martin Chambers by police while he was allegedly robbing a camera store. The unrest lasts several days.
 June 12
 Loving v. Virginia: The United States Supreme Court declares all U.S. state laws prohibiting interracial marriage to be unconstitutional.
 Venera program: Venera 4 is launched by the Soviet Union (the first space probe to enter another planet's atmosphere and successfully return data).
 June 13 – Solicitor General Thurgood Marshall is nominated as the first African American justice of the United States Supreme Court.
 June 14 – Mariner program: Mariner 5 is launched toward Venus.
 June 14 – 15 – Glenn Gould records Prokofiev's Seventh Piano Sonata, Op. 83, in New York City (his only recording of a Prokofiev composition).
 June 16 – The Monterey Pop Festival begins and is held for 3 days.
 June 17 – The People's Republic of China tests its first hydrogen bomb.
 June 18 – Eighteen British soldiers are killed in the Aden police mutiny.
 June 23 – Cold War: U.S. President Lyndon B. Johnson meets with Soviet Premier Alexei Kosygin in Glassboro, New Jersey, for the 3-day Glassboro Summit Conference. Johnson travels to Los Angeles for a dinner at the Century Plaza Hotel where earlier in the day thousands of war protesters clashed with L.A. police.
 June 25 – 400 million viewers watch Our World, the first live, international, satellite television production. It features the live debut of The Beatles' song "All You Need Is Love".
 June 26
 Pope Paul VI ordains 27 new cardinals (one of whom is the future Pope John Paul II).
 The Buffalo Race Riot begins, lasting until July 1; leads to 200 arrests.

 June 27 – The first automatic cash machine (voucher-based) is installed, in the office of Barclays Bank in Enfield, England.
 June 28 – Israel declares the annexation of East Jerusalem.
 June 30 – Moise Tshombe, former President of Katanga and former prime minister of the Democratic Republic of the Congo, is kidnapped to Algeria.

July

 July 1
 Canada celebrates its first one hundred years of Confederation.
 The EEC joins with the European Coal and Steel Community and the European Atomic Community, to form the European Communities (from the 1980s usually known as European Community [EC]).
 Seaboard Air Line Railroad merges with Atlantic Coast Line Railroad to become Seaboard Coast Line Railroad, first step to today's CSX Transportation.
 The first UK colour television broadcasts begin on BBC2. The first one is from the Wimbledon tennis championships. A full colour service begins on BBC2 on December 2.
 American Samoa's first constitution becomes effective.
 July 3 – A military rebellion led by Belgian mercenary Jean Schramme begins in Katanga, Democratic Republic of the Congo.
 July 4 – The British Parliament decriminalizes homosexuality.
 July 5 – Troops of Belgian mercenary commander Jean Schramme revolt against Mobutu Sese Seko, and try to take control of Stanleyville, Congo.
 July 6
 Nigerian Civil War: Nigerian forces invade the secessionist Biafra May 30.
 A level crossing collision between a train loaded with children and a tanker-truck near Magdeburg, East Germany kills 94 people, mostly children.
 July 7 – All You Need Is Love is released in the UK.
 July 10
 Heavy massive rains and a landslide at Kobe and Kure, Hiroshima, Japan, kill at least 371.
 New Zealand decimalises its currency from pound to dollar at £1 to $2 ($1 = 10/-).
 July 12
 The Greek military regime strips 480 Greeks of their citizenship.
 1967 Newark riots: After the arrest of an African-American cab driver for allegedly illegally driving around a police car and gunning it down the road, race riots break out in Newark, New Jersey, lasting 5 days and leaving 26 dead.
 July 14
 The Bee Gees release their first international album Bee Gees' 1st in the UK.
 Near Newark, New Jersey, the Plainfield, NJ, riots take place.
 July 16 – A prison riot in Jay, Florida leaves 37 dead.
 July 18 – The United Kingdom announces the closing of its military bases in Malaysia and Singapore. Australia and the U.S. disapprove.
 July 19
 A race riot breaks out in the North Side of Minneapolis on Plymouth Street during the Minneapolis Aquatennial Parade; businesses are vandalized and fires break out in the area, although the disturbance is quelled within hours. However, the next day a shooting sets off another incident in the same area that leads to 18 fires, 36 arrests, 3 shootings, 2 dozen people injured, and damages totaling 4.2 million. Two more such incidents occur during the following two weeks.
 Eighty-two people are killed in a collision between Piedmont Airlines Flight 22 and a Cessna 310 near Hendersonville, North Carolina.
 July 20 – Chilean poet Pablo Neruda receives the first Viareggio-Versile prize.
 July 23 – 31 – 12th Street Riot: In Detroit, one of the worst riots in United States history begins on 12th Street in the predominantly African American inner city: 43 are killed, 342 injured and 1,400 buildings burned.
 July 24 – During an official state visit to Canada, French President Charles de Gaulle declares to a crowd of over 100,000 in Montreal: Vive le Québec libre! (Long live free Quebec!). The statement, interpreted as support for Quebec independence, delights many Quebecers but angers the Canadian government and many English Canadians.
 July 29
 An explosion and fire aboard the U.S. Navy aircraft carrier  in the Gulf of Tonkin leaves 134 dead.
 Georges Bidault moves to Belgium where he receives political asylum.
 An earthquake in Caracas, Venezuela leaves 240 dead.
 July 30 – The 1967 Milwaukee race riots begin, lasting through August 3 and leading to a ten-day shutdown of the city from August 1.

August

 August 1 – UAC TurboTrain maiden voyage.
 August 2 – The Turkish football club Trabzonspor is established in Trabzon.
 August 5 – Pink Floyd releases their debut album The Piper at the Gates of Dawn in the United Kingdom.
 August 6 – A pulsar is noted by Jocelyn Bell and Antony Hewish. The discovery is first recorded in print in 1968: "An entirely novel kind of star came to light on Aug. 6 last year [...]". The date of the discovery is not recorded.
 August 7
 Vietnam War: The People's Republic of China agrees to give North Vietnam an undisclosed amount of aid in the form of a grant.
 A general strike in the old quarter of Jerusalem protests Israel's unification of the city.
 August 8 – The Association of Southeast Asian Nations (ASEAN) is founded in Bangkok, Thailand.
 August 9 – Vietnam War – Operation Cochise: United States Marines begin a new operation in the Que Son Valley.
 August 10 – Belgian mercenary Jean Schramme's troops take the Congolese border town of Bukavu.
 August 13 – The first line-up of Fleetwood Mac makes their live debut at the Windsor Jazz and Blues Festival.
 August 14 – Wonderful Radio London shuts down at 3:00 PM in anticipation of the Marine Broadcasting Offences Act. Many fans greet the staff upon their return to London that evening with placards reading "Freedom died with Radio London".
 August 15 – The United Kingdom Marine Broadcasting Offences Act declares participation in offshore pirate radio illegal. Radio Caroline defies the Act and continues broadcasting.
 August 19 – West Germany receives 36 East German prisoners it has "purchased" through the border posts of Herleshausen and Wartha.
 August 21
 A truce is declared in the Democratic Republic of the Congo.
 Two U.S. Navy jets stray into the airspace of the People's Republic of China following an attack on a target in North Vietnam and are shot down. Lt. Robert J. Flynn, the only survivor, is captured alive and will be held prisoner by China until 1973.
 August 24 – Pakistan's first steel mill is inaugurated in Chittagong, East Pakistan (Bangladesh).
 August 25 – American Nazi Party leader George Lincoln Rockwell is assassinated in Arlington, Virginia.
 August 27
 The East Coast Wrestling Association is established.
 Beatles manager Brian Epstein is found dead in his locked bedroom.
 August 29 – The final episode of The Fugitive airs on ABC. The broadcast attracts 78 million viewers, one of the largest audiences for a single episode in U.S. television history.
 August 30 – Thurgood Marshall is confirmed as Justice of the United States Supreme Court. He is the first African American to hold the position.

September

 September 1
 The Khmer–Chinese Friendship Association is banned in Cambodia.
 Ilse Koch, known as the "Witch of Buchenwald", commits suicide in the Bavarian prison of Aichach.
 September 3
 Nguyễn Văn Thiệu is elected President of South Vietnam.
 At 5:00 a.m. local time, all road traffic in Sweden switches from left-hand traffic pattern to right-hand traffic.
 September 4 – Vietnam War – Operation Swift: The United States Marines launch a search and destroy mission in Quảng Nam and Quảng Tín provinces. The ensuing 4-day battle in Que Son Valley kills 114 Americans and 376 North Vietnamese.
 September 5 – The television series The Prisoner has its world broadcast premiere on the CTV Television Network in Canada.
 September 10 – In a Gibraltar sovereignty referendum, only 44 voters out of 12,182 in the British Crown colony of Gibraltar support union with Spain.
 September 17
 A riot during a football match in Kayseri, Turkey leaves 44 dead, about 600 injured.
 Jim Morrison and The Doors defy CBS censors on The Ed Sullivan Show, when Morrison sings the word "higher" from their #1 hit Light My Fire, despite having been asked not to.
 September 18 – Love Is a Many Splendored Thing debuts on U.S. daytime television and is the first soap opera to deal with an interracial relationship. CBS censors find it too controversial and ask for it to be stopped, causing show creator Irna Phillips to quit.
 September 27 – The  arrives in Southampton at the end of her last transatlantic crossing.
 September 29
 Tangerine Dream is founded by Edgar Froese in West-Berlin.
 The classic sci-fi TV series Captain Scarlet and the Mysterons broadcasts on ITV.
 September 30 – In the United Kingdom, BBC Radio completely restructures its national programming: the Light Programme is split between new national pop station Radio 1 (modelled on the successful pirate station Radio London) and Radio 2; the cultural Third Programme is rebranded as Radio 3; and the primarily-talk Home Service becomes Radio 4.

October

 October 1 – India gains victory in the Nathu La and Cho La clashes. 
 October 3 – An X-15 research aircraft with test pilot William J. Knight establishes an unofficial world fixed-wing speed record of Mach 6.7.
 October 4
 Omar Ali Saifuddin III of Brunei abdicates in favour of his son, His Majesty Sultan Hassanal Bolkiah.
 The Shag Harbour UFO incident occurs.
 October 6 – Southern California's Pacific Ocean Park, known as the "Disneyland By The Sea", closes down.
 October 8 – Guerrilla leader Che Guevara and his men are captured in Bolivia; they are executed the following day.
 October 12
 Vietnam War: U.S. Secretary of State Dean Rusk states during a news conference that, because of North Vietnam's opposition, proposals by the U.S. Congress for peace initiatives are futile.
 The Naked Ape, by Desmond Morris, is published.
 October 14 – Quebec Nationalism: René Lévesque leaves the Liberal Party.
 October 16 – Thirty-nine people, including singer-activist Joan Baez, are arrested in Oakland, California, for blocking the entrance of that city's military induction center.
 October 17
 The musical Hair opens off-Broadway. It moves to Broadway the following April.
 Vietnam War: The Battle of Ong Thanh takes place.
 October 18
 Vietnam War: Students at the University of Wisconsin–Madison protest over recruitment by Dow Chemical on the university campus; 76 are injured in the resulting riot.
 Walt Disney's 19th full-length animated feature The Jungle Book, the last animated film personally supervised by Disney, is released and becomes an enormous box-office and critical success. On a double bill with the film is the (now) much less well-known true-life adventure, Charlie the Lonesome Cougar.
 The Venera 4 probe descends through the Venusian atmosphere.
 A total lunar eclipse occurred.
 October 19 – The Mariner 5 probe flies by Venus.
 October 20 – Patterson–Gimlin film: Roger Patterson and Robert Gimlin's famous film of an unidentified animate cryptid, thought to be Bigfoot or Sasquatch, is recorded at Bluff Creek, California.
 October 21
 Approximately 70,000 Vietnam War protesters march in Washington, D.C. and rally at the Lincoln Memorial; in a successive march that day, 50,000 people march to the Pentagon, where Allen Ginsberg, Abbie Hoffman, and Jerry Rubin symbolically chant to "levitate" the building and "exorcise the evil within."
 An Egyptian surface-to-surface missile sinks the Israeli destroyer Eilat, killing 47 Israeli sailors. Israel retaliates by shelling Egyptian refineries along the Suez Canal.
 October 23 – Charles de Gaulle becomes the first French Co-Prince of Andorra to visit his Andorran subjects. In addition to being President of France, de Gaulle is a joint ruler (along with Spain's Bishop of Urgel) of the tiny nation located in the mountains between France and Spain, pursuant to the 1278 agreement creating the nation.
 October 25 – The Abortion Act 1967 passes in the British Parliament and receives royal assent two days later.
 October 26
 The coronation ceremony of Shah Mohammad Reza Pahlavi of Iran, ruler of the nation since 1941, takes place.
 U.S. Navy pilot John McCain is shot down over North Vietnam and taken prisoner. His capture is confirmed two days later, and he remains a prisoner of war for more than five years.
 October 27
 French President Charles de Gaulle vetoes British entry into the European Economic Community for the second time in the decade.
 London criminal Jack McVitie is murdered by the Kray twins, a crime that eventually leads to their imprisonment and downfall.
 October 29
 President Joseph Mobutu of the Democratic Republic of the Congo launches an offensive against mercenaries in Bukavu.
 Expo 67 closes in Montreal, after having attracted more than 50 million visitors in six months.
 October 30 – Hong Kong 1967 riots: British troops and Chinese demonstrators clash on the border of China and Hong Kong.

November

 November – Islamabad officially becomes Pakistan's political capital, replacing Karachi.
 November 2
 Vietnam War: U.S. President Lyndon B. Johnson holds a secret meeting with a group of the nation's most prestigious leaders ("the Wise Men") and asks them to suggest ways to unite the American people behind the war effort. They conclude that the American people should be given more optimistic reports on the progress of the war.
 A non-central total solar eclipse took place.
 November 3 – Vietnam War – Battle of Dak To: Around Đắk Tô (located about 280 miles north of Saigon near the Cambodian border), heavy casualties are suffered on both sides; U.S. troops narrowly win the battle on November 22.
 November 4 – 5 – In the Democratic Republic of the Congo, mercenaries of Jean Schramme and Jerry Puren withdraw from Bukavu, over the Shangugu Bridge, to Rwanda.
 November 6 – The Rhodesian parliament passes pro-Apartheid laws.
 November 7
 U.S. President Lyndon B. Johnson signs the Public Broadcasting Act of 1967, establishing the Corporation for Public Broadcasting.
 Carl B. Stokes is elected Mayor of Cleveland, Ohio, becoming the first African American elected mayor of a major United States city.
 The 50th anniversary of the Great October Socialist Revolution is celebrated in the Soviet Union.
 November 8 – The BBC's first local radio station (BBC Radio Leicester) is launched.
 November 9 – Apollo program: NASA launches the first Saturn V rocket, successfully carrying the Apollo 4 test spacecraft from Cape Kennedy into Earth orbit.
 November 11 – Vietnam War: In a ceremony in Phnom Penh, Cambodia, 3 United States prisoners of war are released by the Viet Cong and turned over to American "New Left" antiwar activist Tom Hayden.
 November 14 – The Congress of Colombia, in commemoration of the 150-year anniversary of the death of Policarpa Salavarrieta, declares this day as the "Day of the Colombian Woman".
 November 15
 General Georgios Grivas and his 10,000 strong Greek Army division are forced to leave Cyprus, after 24 Turkish Cypriot civilians are killed by the Greek Cypriot National Guard in the villages of Kophinou and Ayios Theodhoros; relations sour between Nicosia and Athens. Turkey flies sorties into Greek territory, and masses troops in Thrace on her border with Greece.
 Test pilot Michael Adams is killed when his X-15 rocket plane tumbles out of control during atmospheric re-entry and disintegrates.
 November 17
 Vietnam War: Acting on optimistic reports he was given on November 13, U.S. President Lyndon B. Johnson tells the nation that, while much remains to be done, "We are inflicting greater losses than we're taking ... We are making progress." (Two months later the Tet Offensive by the Viet Cong is widely reported as a Viet Cong victory by the U.S. press and thus as a major setback to the U.S.)
 French author Régis Debray is sentenced to 30 years imprisonment in Bolivia. (He will be released in 1970 after less than three years imprisonment.)
 November 18 – The UK pound is devalued from £1 = US$2.80 to £1 = US$2.40.
 November 19 – The establishment of TVB, the first wireless commercial television station in Hong Kong.
 November 20 – The "population clock" of the United States Census Bureau records the U.S. population at 200 million people at 11:03 a.m. Washington, D.C. time.
 November 21 – Vietnam War: United States General William Westmoreland tells news reporters: "I am absolutely certain that whereas in 1965 the enemy was winning, today he is certainly losing."
 November 22 – UN Security Council Resolution 242 is adopted by the UN Security Council, establishing a set of principles aimed at guiding negotiations for an Arab–Israeli peace settlement.
 November 25 – 1967 Australian Senate election: The Liberal/Country Coalition Government led by Prime Minister Harold Holt lost two seats, while the Labor Party led by Gough Whitlam failed to make any gains. The Democratic Labor Party won the two seats from the Liberals and gained the sole balance of power in the Senate.
 November 26 – Major floods hit Lisbon, Portugal, killing 462.
 November 27 – The Beatles release Magical Mystery Tour in the U.S. as a full album. The songs added to the original six songs on the double EP include "All You Need Is Love", "Penny Lane", "Strawberry Fields Forever", "Baby, You're a Rich Man" and "Hello, Goodbye". Release as a double EP will not take place in the UK until December.
 November 28 – The first pulsar to be discovered by Earth observers is found in the constellation of Vulpecula by astronomers Jocelyn Bell Burnell and Antony Hewish, and is given the name PSR B1919+21.
 November 29 – Vietnam War: U.S. Secretary of Defense Robert McNamara announces his resignation to become president of the World Bank. McNamara's resignation follows U.S. President Lyndon B. Johnson's outright rejection of McNamara's early November recommendations to freeze troop levels, stop the bombing of North Vietnam, and hand over ground fighting to South Vietnam.
 November 30
 Zulfikar Ali Bhutto founds the Pakistan People's Party and becomes its first chairman. It has gone on to become one of Pakistan's major political parties (alongside the Pakistan Muslim League) that is broken into many factions, bearing the same name under different leaders, such as the Pakistan's Peoples Party Parliamentarians (PPPP).
 The People's Republic of South Yemen becomes independent of the United Kingdom.
 Pro-Soviet communists in the Philippines establish Malayang Pagkakaisa ng Kabataan Pilipino as its new youth wing.
 U.S. Senator Eugene McCarthy announces his candidacy for the Democratic Party presidential nomination, challenging incumbent President Lyndon B. Johnson over the Vietnam War.

December

 December 1
 The Jimi Hendrix Experience releases Axis: Bold as Love.
 The RMS Queen Mary is retired. Her place is taken by the Queen Elizabeth 2.
 December 3 – Christiaan Barnard carries out the world's first heart transplant at Groote Schuur Hospital in Cape Town, South Africa.
 December 4
 At 6:50 PM, a volcano erupts on Deception Island in Antarctica.
 Vietnam War: U.S. and South Vietnamese forces engage Viet Cong troops in the Mekong Delta (235 of the 300-strong Viet Cong battalion are killed).
 December 5 – In New York City, Benjamin Spock and Allen Ginsberg are arrested for protesting against the Vietnam War.
 December 6 – Vice President Jorge Pacheco Areco is sworn in as President of Uruguay after President Oscar Gestido dies in office.
 December 8 – Magical Mystery Tour is released by The Beatles as a double EP in the UK, while the only psychedelic rock album by The Rolling Stones, Their Satanic Majesties Request, is released in the UK and in the USA.
 December 9
 Nicolae Ceaușescu becomes the Chairman of the Romanian State Council, making him the de facto leader of Romania.
 Jim Morrison is arrested on stage in New Haven, Connecticut for attempting to spark a riot in the audience during a concert. 
 December 11 – Supersonic airliner Concorde is unveiled in Toulouse, France.
 December 12 – Guess Who's Coming to Dinner, one of the seminal race relations films of the 1960s, is released to theaters.
 December 13 – King Constantine II of Greece flees the country when his coup attempt fails.
 December 15 – The Silver Bridge over the Ohio River in Point Pleasant, West Virginia, collapses, killing 46 people. 
 December 17 – Harold Holt, 17th Prime Minister of Australia, disappears when swimming at Cheviot Beach, 60 km from Melbourne. He was briefly replaced as Prime Minister by John McEwen, until the Liberal Party elected Minister for Education and Science John Gorton as leader.
 December 19 – Professor John Archibald Wheeler coined the astronomical term black hole.
 December 26 – The Beatles' film Magical Mystery Tour receives its world première on BBC Television in the UK.
 December 29 – Hyundai Motor founded in South Korea. 
 December 31
 The Green Bay Packers become the first team in the modern era to win their third consecutive NFL Championship. They defeat the Dallas Cowboys 21-17 in what becomes known as "The Ice Bowl".
 Motorcycle daredevil Evel Knievel attempts to jump 141 feet over the Caesars Palace Fountains on the Las Vegas Strip. Knievel crashes on landing and the accident is caught on film.

Date unknown
 Warner Bros. becomes a wholly owned subsidiary of Seven Arts Productions, thus becoming Warner Bros.-Seven Arts.
 The Jari project begins in the Amazon.
 Albania is officially declared an atheist state by its leader, Enver Hoxha.
 The University of Winnipeg is founded in Canada.
 Lonsdaleite (the rarest allotrope of carbon) is first discovered in the Barringer Crater, Arizona.
 St Christopher's Hospice, the world's first purpose-built secular hospice specialising in palliative care of the terminally ill, is established in South London by Dame Cicely Saunders with the support of Albertine Winner.
 PAL is first introduced in Germany.
 Gunsmoke, after 12 seasons and with declining ratings, almost gets cancelled, but protests from viewers, network affiliates and even members of Congress and especially William S. Paley, the head of the network, lead the network to move the series from its longtime late Saturday time slot to early Mondays for the fall—displacing Gilligan's Island, which initially had been renewed for a fourth season but is cancelled instead. Gunsmoke would remain on CBS until 1975.
 Lech Wałęsa goes to work in Gdańsk shipyards.
 The Greek military junta exiles Melina Mercouri.
 Parker Morris Standards become mandatory for all housing built in new towns in the United Kingdom.
 Sabon typeface, designed by Jan Tschichold, introduced.
 Gabriel García Márquez's influential novel One Hundred Years of Solitude is published (in Spanish).
 The first edition of the book, A Short History of Pakistan, is published by Karachi University, Pakistan.
 Fernand Braudel begins publication of Civilisation matérielle, économie et capitalisme, XVe-XVIIIe siècle.
 The National Hockey League adds six more teams, doubling its size. The teams are the St. Louis Blues, Oakland Seals, Minnesota North Stars, Los Angeles Kings, Philadelphia Flyers, and Pittsburgh Penguins.

Births

January

 January 1 
 Sunny Chan, Hong Kong actor
 Derrick Thomas, American football player (d. 2000)
 January 2 
 Marcelo Costa de Andrade, Brazilian serial killer
 Tia Carrere, American actress
 Jón Gnarr, Icelandic comedian and politician
 Gary Larson, Australian rugby league player
Francois Pienaar, South African rugby union player and coach
 January 4 – Marina Orsini, Canadian actress
 January 6 – A. R. Rahman, Indian composer, singer, and music producer
 January 7
 David Berman, American musician (Silver Jews), singer, poet, and cartoonist (d. 2019)
 Nick Clegg, British politician
 Irrfan Khan, Indian actor (d. 2020)
 Mark Lamarr, British comedian, TV and radio presenter
 Ricky Stuart, Australian rugby league player and coach
 January 8
 Małgorzata Foremniak, Polish actress
 R. Kelly, American R&B singer, songwriter, and convicted sex offender
 January 9
 Dale Gordon, English footballer
 Dave Matthews, South African–born American musician
 January 11 – Michael Healy-Rae, Irish politician
 January 12 – Vendela Kirsebom, Norwegian supermodel
 January 13
 Matjaž Cvikl, Slovenian footballer (d. 1999) 
 Suzanne Cryer, American actress
 January 14
 Kerri Green, American actress and film director
 Leo Ortolani, Italian comic book author
 Emily Watson, English actress
 January 15 – Lisa Lisa, American actress and singer
 January 16 – Andrea James, American producer and author 
 January 17 – Song Kang-ho, Korean actor
 January 18 
 Kim Perrot, American basketball player (d. 1999)
 Iván Zamorano, Chilean footballer
 January 19 – Christine Tucci, American actress
 January 20
 Wigald Boning, German actor, singer, writer and television presenter
 Kellyanne Conway, American pollster, political consultant, and pundit
Aderonke Apata, advocate for LGBT equality, lesbian, human rights activist, feminist, and former asylum seeker.
 January 21 – Artashes Minasian, Armenian chess grandmaster
 January 23
Magdalena Andersson, 34th Prime Minister of Sweden 
Belkis Ayón, Cuban printmaker (d. 1999)
Mohammad Daud Miraki, Afghan politician and activist
Naim Süleymanoğlu, Turkish weightlifter (d. 2017)
 January 24
 Phil LaMarr, American actor, voice actor, comedian, and writer
 John Myung, American musician
 January 25
 Nozomu Sasaki, Japanese voice actor
 Voltaire, Cuban singer
 January 28 – Bongani Mayosi, South African cardiology professor (d. 2018)
 January 29 
 Khalid Skah, Moroccan long-distance runner
 Cyril Suk, Czech tennis player
 January 31
 Randy Bernard, former CEO of Professional Bull Riders and IndyCar, current co-manager of Garth Brooks
 Fat Mike, American musician and producer
 Roberto Palazuelos, Mexican actor
 Joey Wong, Taiwanese actress

February

 

 February 1 – Meg Cabot, American teen author
 February 4 – Sergei Grinkov, Russian figure skater (d. 1995)
 February 5 – Chris Parnell, American actor, voice artist, comedian, and singer 
 February 6 – Izumi Sakai, Japanese singer (Zard) (d. 2007)
 February 10
 Laura Dern, American actress
 Vince Gilligan, American writer, director and producer
 February 13 – Carolyn Lawrence, American actress and voice actress
 February 14
 Manuela Maleeva, Bulgarian born-Swiss tennis player
 Mark Rutte, Dutch politician, 50th Prime Minister of the Netherlands since 2010.
 Sir Stelios Haji-Ioannou, British-Greek entrepreneur
 February 18
 Roberto Baggio, Italian football player
 Colin Jackson, British former sprint and hurdling athlete
 February 19 – Benicio del Toro, Puerto Rican actor
 February 20
 Kurt Cobain, American musician (Nirvana) (d. 1994)
 David Herman, American actor
 Andrew Shue, American actor and activist
 Lili Taylor, American actress
 February 21 – Sari Essayah, Finnish politician and racewalker
 February 22 – Paul Lieberstein, American screenwriter and actor
 February 26
 Currie Graham, Canadian actor
 Kazuyoshi Miura, Japanese footballer
 February 27 – Jonathan Ive, British industrial designer (Apple Inc.)

March

 March 1
 Michael Mronz, German sports and events manager
 George Eads, American actor
 Rosyam Nor, Malaysian actor
 March 3
 Alexander Volkov, Russian tennis player (d. 2019)
 Hans Teeuwen, Dutch comedian
 March 4
 Daryll Cullinan, South African cricketer
 Tim Vine, English comedian and actor
 March 6
 Connie Britton, American actress
 Glenn Greenwald, American journalist and author 
 Mihai Tudose, Prime Minister of Romania
 March 7 – Jean-Pierre Barda, Swedish singer (Army of Lovers)
 March 9 – Nikolas Vogel, German actor and news camera operator (d. 1991)
 March 11
 John Barrowman, Scottish-American actor and singer
 Cynthia Klitbo, Mexican actress 
 George Gray, American comedian and game show announcer
 March 12 – Massimiliano Frezzato, Italian comic writer
 March 13 
 Andrés Escobar, Colombian football player (d. 1994)
 Roger Schmidt, German football player and coach
 March 14 – Tomáš Cihlář, Czech chemist and virologist
 March 15
 Naoko Takeuchi, Japanese artist
 Pierre Coffin, French film director and voice actor (Despicable Me, Minions)
 March 16
 Lauren Graham, American actress and singer
 John Mangum, American professional football player
 March 17 – Billy Corgan, American musician and songwriter
 March 18
 Taiten Kusunoki, Japanese actor and voice artist
 Andre Rison, American pro football player
 Miki Berenyi, British musician and songwriter (Lush and Piroshka)
 March 21 – Jonas Berggren, Swedish musician 
 March 22 – Mario Cipollini, Italian cyclist
 March 25
 Matthew Barney, American sculptor, photographer and filmmaker
 Debi Thomas, American figure skater
 March 27
 Kenta Kobashi, Japanese professional wrestler
 Talisa Soto, American actress
 March 29 – Nathalie Cardone, French actress and singer
 March 30
 Albert-László Barabási, Romanian-born Hungarian-American physicist
 Christopher Bowman, American figure skater (d. 2008)
 Megumi Hayashibara, Japanese actress and voice actress

April

 April 2 – Renée Estevez, American actress and writer
 April 4 – Xenia Seeberg, German actress
 April 5
 Anu Garg, Indian-American writer and speaker
 Troy Gentry, American country musician (Montgomery Gentry) (d. 2017)
 April 6
 Kathleen Barr, Canadian voice actress
 Jonathan Firth, English actor
 Mika Koivuniemi, Finnish ten-pin bowler
 April 9
 Sam Harris, American neuroscientist and political podcast host
 Alex Kahn, American artist
 April 11 – Liina Olmaru, Estonian actress 
 April 13 – Jimmy Nah, Singaporean comedian and actor (d. 2008)
 April 14 – Steve Chiasson, Canadian ice hockey player (d. 1999)
 April 15
 Frankie Poullain, British rock bassist 
 Dara Torres, American swimmer
 April 17
 Henry Ian Cusick, Scottish-Peruvian actor and director
 Kimberly Elise, African-American actress
 Marquis Grissom, American baseball player
 Liz Phair, American musician
 April 18 – Maria Bello, American actress
 April 20
 Mike Portnoy, American musician
 Lara Jill Miller, American actress
 Raymond van Barneveld, Dutch darts player
 April 22
 Sheryl Lee, American actress
 Sherri Shepherd, American comedian and TV show host
 April 23
 Melina Kanakaredes, American actress
 Eleonora De Angelis, Italian voice actress
 April 24 
Dino Rađa, Croatian basketball player
Shannon Larkin, American drummer
 April 26
 Glenn Jacobs (a.k.a. "Kane"), American professional wrestler
 Marianne Jean-Baptiste, English actress, singer-songwriter, composer and director
 April 27
Simcha Barbiro, Israeli actor and voice actor
 Willem-Alexander of the Netherlands, King of the Netherlands
Aki Avni, Israeli actor
 April 28 – Kari Wuhrer, American actress
 April 29
 Curtis Joseph, Canadian hockey player
 Igor Meda, former Russian professional footballer
 Rachel Williams, American model, actress and television presenter
 April 30
 Philipp Kirkorov, Soviet-Russian pop singer, actor and producer
 Steven Mackintosh, English actor
 Nalin Pekgul, Turkish born-Swedish politician

May

 May 1
 Scott Coffey, American actor and director
 Kenny Hotz, Canadian entertainer
 Myriam Hernández, Chilean singer
 Tim McGraw, American country singer
 May 4
 Ana Gasteyer, American actress
 Ronny Jackson, American politician and physician
 Akiko Yajima, Japanese voice actress
 May 5
 Takehito Koyasu, Japanese voice actor
 Bill Ward, English actor
 May 8 – Angus Scott, British sports television presenter
 May 10 – Nobuhiro Takeda, Japanese footballer and sportscaster
 May 11 – Géza Röhrig, Hungarian actor and poet
 May 12
 Brent Forrester, American writer and producer 
 Bill Shorten, Australian politician
 May 13
 Chuck Schuldiner, American singer and guitarist (d. 2001)
 Melanie Thornton, American singer (La Bouche) (d. 2001)
 May 14 – Tony Siragusa, American football player
 May 15
 Madhuri Dixit, Indian actress
 John Smoltz, American baseball player
 Ernesto Araújo, Brazil's former Minister of Foreign Affairs 
 May 17 – Greg Florimo, Australian rugby league player and administrator 
 May 19 – Geraldine Somerville, Irish actress
 May 20 – Pavlos, Crown Prince of Greece
 May 21 – Chris Benoit, Canadian professional wrestler (d. 2007)
 May 22 – Brooke Smith, American actress
 May 23 – Rahman, Indian actor
 May 24
 Andrey Borodin, Russian banker
 Eric Close, American actor
 Heavy D, Jamaican-born American rapper, singer, record producer, and actor (d. 2011)
 Bruno Putzulu, French actor
 May 25 
Poppy Z. Brite, American author
 Andrew Sznajder, Canadian tennis player
 May 26
 Stacy Compton, American racing driver
 Eddie McClintock, American actor
 Kristen Pfaff, American bassist (d. 1994)
 May 27
 Paul Gascoigne, English footballer
 Kai Pflaume, German television presenter and game show host
 Kristen Skjeldal, Norwegian Olympic skier
 May 28 
 Kajsa Ollongren, Dutch politician
 Glen Rice, American basketball player
 May 29
 Heidi Mohr, German footballer (d. 2019)
 Noel Gallagher, British musician (Oasis)
 May 30
 Grant Kereama, New Zealand Radio DJ, Actor, and television host.
 May 31
 Sandrine Bonnaire, French actress
 Phil Keoghan, New Zealand-born television host (The Amazing Race)
 Kenny Lofton, American baseball player

June

 June 1 – Roger Sanchez, American DJ
 June 2 – Nadhim Zahawi, Iraqi-born British politician
 June 3
 Anderson Cooper, American television journalist
 Tamás Darnyi, Hungarian swimmer
 Christopher Walker, Gibraltarian triathlete and cyclist
 June 5
 Joe DeLoach, American athlete
 Ron Livingston, American actor
 June 6
 Max Casella, American actor
 Tristan Gemmill, English actor
 Paul Giamatti, American actor
 June 7
 Olli Mustonen, Finnish pianist and composer
 Dave Navarro, American guitarist and singer (Jane's Addiction, Red Hot Chili Peppers)
 June 8
 Efan Ekoku, Nigerian footballer
 Jasmin Tabatabai, German/Iranian actress and musician
 June 9 
Jian Ghomeshi, Iranian-Canadian radio personality
Rubén Maza, Venezuelan long-distance runner
 June 10
 Emma Anderson, British musician and songwriter (Lush and Sing-Sing)
 Darren Robinson, African-American rapper (The Fat Boys) (d. 1995)
 Elizabeth Wettlaufer, Canadian nurse and serial killer
 June 11 – Isabela Garcia, Brazilian actress
 June 14 – Rushan Abbas, Uyghur-American activist
 June 15
 Fred Tatasciore, American voice actor
 Yūji Ueda, Japanese voice actor
 June 16 
 Jürgen Klopp, German footballer and manager of Liverpool F.C.
 Ike Shorunmu, Nigerian football goalkeeper
 June 19
 Bjørn Dæhlie, Norwegian Olympic skier
 Mia Sara, American actress
 June 20 – Nicole Kidman, American-born Australian actress
 June 21 – Yingluck Shinawatra, Thai politician, 28th Prime Minister of Thailand
 June 23 – Yoko Minamino, Japanese Idol star and actress
 June 24
 Richard Kruspe, German rock musician (Rammstein)
 Mia St. John, American boxer
 June 26
 Kaori Asoh, Japanese voice actress and singer
 Luisito Espinosa, Filipino boxer
 June 28 – Lars Riedel, German Olympic athlete
 June 29
 Carl Hester, British dressage rider
 Melora Hardin, American actress and singer
 June 30
 Quốc Bảo, Vietnamese songwriter and record producer
 Sture Fladmark, Norwegian football manager and player
Babak NikTalab, Persian poet.
 Robert Więckiewicz, Polish film and television actor

July

 July 1
 Pamela Anderson, Canadian actress and model
 Luca Bottale, Italian voice actor
 Ritchie Coster, English film, television, and theatre actor
 Kim Komando, American talk radio program host
 Peter Plate, German musician, singer, songwriter and record producer
 July 2
 Maïtena Biraben, French-Swiss television presenter and producer
 Paul Wekesa, Kenyan tennis player
 July 4 – Greg Kuperberg, Polish-American mathematician
 July 5
 Mustafa Al-Kadhimi, Iraqi politician, 80th Prime Minister of Iraq
 Silvia Ziche, Italian comics artist
 Steffen Wink, German actor
 July 6
 Wendell Lawrence, Bahamian triple jumper 
 Heather Nova, Bermudian singer-songwriter
 July 7 – Tom Kristensen, Danish racing driver 
 July 8
 Charlie Cardona, Colombian singer
 Jordan Chan, Hong Kong singer and actor
 Henry McKop, Zimbabwean football defender
 July 9
 Gunnar Axén, Swedish politician
 Mark Stoops, American football coach
 July 10
 Tom Meents, American monster truck driver
 Ikki Sawamura, Japanese model, film and television actor, and television presenter
 July 11 – Jhumpa Lahiri, British-born Indian-American author
 July 12
 John Petrucci, American musician
 Count Jefferson von Pfeil und Klein-Ellguth
 July 13
 Benny Benassi, Italian DJ, record producer and remixer
 Akira Hokuto, Japanese women's professional wrestler
 July 14
 Jeff Jarrett, American professional wrestler
 Patrick J. Kennedy, American politician 
 Valérie Pécresse, French politician
 Robin Ventura, American baseball player
 July 15
 Christopher Golden, American novelist
 Adam Savage, American TV show host
 Michael Tse, Hong Kong actor
 July 16
 Jonathan Adams, American actor and voice actor
 Brian Baker, American actor
 Will Ferrell, American actor, comedian, and screenwriter
 Joel Stransky, South African rugby union player
 Mihaela Stanulet, Romanian artistic gymnast
 July 17 – Regina Lund, Swedish actress and singer
 July 18
 Vin Diesel, American actor and film producer
 Martin Eric Ain, Swiss-American musician (d. 2017)
 July 19
 Rageh Omaar, broadcaster
 Lee Hsing-wen, Taiwanese actor
 July 20 
Reed Diamond, American actor
Courtney Taylor-Taylor, American singer-songwriter, frontman of The Dandy Warhols
 July 22
 Irene Bedard, American actress
 Jeremy Callaghan, Papua New Guinean actor
 Rhys Ifans, Welsh actor and musician
 July 23 – Philip Seymour Hoffman, American actor, director, and producer (d. 2014)
 July 24 – Fatima Rainey, Swedish singer
 July 25
 Matt LeBlanc, American actor
 Wendy Raquel Robinson, American actress
 Margarita Zavala, Mexican lawyer and politician, First Lady of Mexico
 Magdalena Forsberg, Swedish biathlete
 July 26 – Jason Statham, English actor, martial artist, and former diver
 July 28
 Jakob Augstein, German journalist and publisher
 Taka Hirose, Japanese musician (Feeder)
Jeff Sharples, Canadian NHL defenceman and podcaster
 July 30
 Marisol Espinoza, Peruvian politician, 1st Vice President of Peru
 A. W. Yrjänä, Finnish rock musician and poet
 July 31
 Tony Bancroft, American artist (Disney)
 Rodney Harvey, American actor and model (d. 1998)
 Minako Honda, Japanese singer and musical actress (d. 2005)
 Elizabeth Wurtzel, author and feminist (d. 2020)

August

 August 2 – Aaron Krickstein, American tennis player
 August 3 – Mathieu Kassovitz, French movie director and actor
 August 4
 Tom Anderson, American partner at Optima Public Relations
 Arbaaz Khan, Indian actor
 Michael Marsh, American athlete
 August 5
 Patrick Baumann, Swiss basketball executive and player and coach (d. 2018)
 Thomas Lang, Austrian drummer
 August 7 
 Eston Mulenga, Zambian footballer (d. 1993)
 Charlotte Lewis, English actress
 August 8
 Yūki Amami, Japanese actress
 Sable, American wrestler, model and actress
 August 9 – Deion Sanders, American pro football and baseball player
 August 10 – Riddick Bowe, American boxer
 August 11
 Enrique Bunbury, Spanish singer-songwriter
 Collin Chou, Taiwanese martial arts actor
 Joe Rogan, American comedian and television host
 Massimiliano Allegri, former Italian association football player and coach 
 August 12
 Andy Hui, Hong Kong singer and actor
 Emil Kostadinov, Bulgarian football player
 Regilio Tuur, Dutch boxer
 August 13
 Amélie Nothomb, Belgian writer
 Jeanine Áñez, President of Bolivia
 August 15 – Brahim Boutayeb, Moroccan long-distance runner
 August 16
 Mark Coyne, Australian rugby league player 
 Ulrika Jonsson, Swedish-born television personality
 Pamela Smart, American murderer
 August 18 – Daler Mehndi, Indian singer
 August 19 
 Satya Nadella, Indian-American businessman and current CEO of Microsoft
 Deborah Kafoury, Oregon Elected Leader
 August 21
 Carrie-Anne Moss, Canadian actress
 Serj Tankian, Lebanese-born singer (System of a Down)
 August 22
 Adewale Akinnuoye-Agbaje, Nigerian-British actor and model
 Ty Burrell, American actor and comedian
 Yukiko Okada, Japanese idol singer (d. 1986)
 Layne Staley, American rock musician (Alice in Chains) (d. 2002)
 August 25
 Tom Hollander, English actor
 Eckart von Hirschhausen, German physician and comedian
 August 26
 Michael Gove, British politician
 András Rosztóczy, Hungarian gastroenterologist
 August 27
 Ogie Alcasid, Filipino singer-songwriter, comedian, parodist, and actor
 Bob Nastanovich, American musician (Pavement, Silver Jews)
 August 28 – Masaaki Endoh, Japanese singer
 August 29
 Neil Gorsuch, Associate Justice of the U.S. Supreme Court since 2017
 Anton Newcombe, American musician (The Brian Jonestown Massacre)
 August 30 – Frederique van der Wal, Dutch supermodel
31 August – Gene Hoglan, American drummer

September

 September 3
 Drena De Niro, American actress
 Luis Gonzalez, American baseball player
 Sedrak Saroyan, Armenian general and politician (d. 2022)
 September 5
 Kōichi Morishita, Japanese long-distance runner
 Arnel Pineda, Filipino singer-songwriter (Journey)
 Matthias Sammer, German football player
 Jane Sixsmith, English field hockey player
 September 6 – Macy Gray, African-American urban musician
 September 9 – Akshay Kumar, Indian actor
 September 11 – Harry Connick Jr., American singer and actor
 September 12
 Louis C.K., American comedian and actor
 Rob Renzetti, American animator and director
 September 13
 Michael Johnson, American sprinter
 Temur Kabisashvili, retired Georgian professional football player
 Tim "Ripper" Owens, American rock singer (Judas Priest, Iced Earth, Yngwie Malmsteen)
 September 16 – Alain Claude Bilie By Nze, Gabonese politician, 13th Prime Minister of Gabon
 September 18
 Tara Fitzgerald, British actress
 Mónica Kräuter, Venezuelan chemist and professor
 September 19 – Aleksandr Karelin, Russian Greco-Roman wrestler
 September 20 – Kristen Johnston, American actress
 September 21
 Faith Hill, American country singer
 Suman Pokhrel, Nepalese poet
 September 22 – Félix Savón, Cuban boxer
 September 23
 Masashi Nakayama, Japanese footballer
 Jenna Stern, American actress
 September 25
 Melissa De Sousa, American actress
 Audrey Wasilewski, American actress and voice actress
September 26 – Shannon Hoon, singer songwriter and musician; lead singer in the band Blind Melon from 1990 until his death in 1995
 September 27 – Debi Derryberry, American voice actress
 September 28
 Mira Sorvino, American actress
 Moon Zappa, American actress, musician and author
 September 30 – Andrea Roth, Canadian actress

October

 October 1 – Gillian Welch, American country singer-songwriter
 October 2
 Frankie Fredericks, Namibian athlete
 Lew Temple, American actor
 October 3
 Jay Taylor, American basketball player (d. 1998)
 Tiara Jacquelina, Malaysian actress
 Rob Liefeld, American author and illustrator
 Denis Villeneuve, Canadian film director and writer
 October 4 – Liev Schreiber, American actor and film director
 October 5 
 Rex Chapman, American basketball player
 Guy Pearce, English-born Australian actor
 October 6
 Bruno Bichir, Mexican actor
 Sergi López Segú, Spanish footballer (d. 2006)
 October 7
 Samir Guesmi, French actor 
 Toni Braxton, American R&B singer
 October 9 
 Maurice Banach, German footballer (d. 1991)
 Eddie Guerrero, Mexican-American professional wrestler (d. 2005)
 October 10
 Gavin Newsom, American politician, 40th Governor of California
 Michael Giacchino, American film composer
 October 11
 Artie Lange, American actor, comedian and radio personality
 Peter Thiel, German-American entrepreneur and venture capitalist 
 October 13
 Trevor Hoffman, American Major League Baseball player
 Hannu Lintu, Finnish conductor
 Javier Sotomayor, Cuban high jumper
 Kate Walsh, American actress
 October 16 – Davina McCall, British TV presenter and UK Big Brother host
 October 17 
 René Dif, Danish-Algerian singer (Aqua)
 Nathalie Tauziat, French tennis player
 October 18 – Eric Stuart, American voice actor, singer, and voice director
 October 19 – Yōji Matsuda, Japanese actor and voice actor
 October 20
 Susan Tully, English television director, producer and former actress
 Kerrod Walters, Australian rugby league player
 Kevin Walters, Australian rugby league player and coach
 October 21 – Pam Rehm, American poet
 October 22
 Salvatore Di Vittorio, Italian composer-conductor
 Ulrike Maier, Austrian alpine skier (d. 1994)
 Carlos Mencia, Latino-American actor and standup comedian
 October 24
 Andrea Hirata, Indonesian author
 Jacqueline McKenzie, Australian actress
 October 26 
 Elisabeth Svantesson, Swedish politician
 Keith Urban, New Zealand-born Australian country music singer
 October 27 – Scott Weiland, American musician (d. 2015)
 October 28
 Julia Roberts, American actress
 Sophie, Hereditary Princess of Liechtenstein
 October 29
 Joely Fisher, American actress
 Péter Kun, Hungarian guitarist (d. 1993)
 Rufus Sewell, English actor
 Beth Chapman, American bounty hunter (d. 2019)
 October 30
 Ty Detmer, American NFL quarterback; 1990 Heisman Trophy winner
 Gavin Rossdale, English singer-songwriter and actor
 October 31
 Vanilla Ice, American rapper
 Buddy Lazier, American race car driver

November

 November 1 – Tina Arena, Australian singer-songwriter
 November 2
 Akira Ishida, Japanese voice actor
 Scott Walker, American legislator and politician; 45th Governor of Wisconsin (2011–2019)
 November 3 – Steven Wilson, British musician
 November 4
Keith English, American politician (d. 2018)
Mino Raiola, Italian football agent (d. 2022)
 November 5 – Judy Reyes, American actress
 November 6 
Pervin Buldan, Turkish-Kurdish politician
Rebecca Schaeffer, American actress (d. 1989)
 November 7
 Father Paulo Ricardo, Brazilian Catholic priest, TV host, writer, and professor
 Noraini Ahmad, Malaysian politician
 David Guetta, French DJ and songwriter
 Sharleen Spiteri, Scottish singer-songwriter
 November 8 – Courtney Thorne-Smith, American actress
 November 11 – Gil de Ferran, Brazilian race car driver
 November 13
 Juhi Chawla, Indian actress, model, and film producer
 Jimmy Kimmel, American comedian and talk show host
 Steve Zahn, American actor
 November 14
 Letitia Dean, English actress
 Mary Woodvine, British actress
 November 15 
 François Ozon, French writer and director
 E-40, American rapper
 November 16 – Lisa Bonet, American actress
 November 17 – Zuhdi Jasser, American religious commentator and medical doctor
 November 20 – Teoman, Turkish rock singer and songwriter
 November 22
 Boris Becker, German tennis player
 Mark Ruffalo, American actor
 Bart Veldkamp, Dutch-born speed skater
 November 23 – Salli Richardson, American actress
 November 24 – Jon Hein, American radio personality
 November 25
 Anthony Nesty, Surinamese swimmer
 Mikey D, American rapper
 November 28 – Anna Nicole Smith, American model and actress (d. 2007)
 November 29 – Fernando Ramos da Silva, Brazilian actor, known as Pixote (d. 1987)

December

 December 1
 Néstor Carbonell, American actor, director and screenwriter
 Reggie Sanders, American Major League Baseball outfielder
 December 4 – Adamski, English dance music producer
 December 5 – Knez, Montenegrin singer
 December 6 – Judd Apatow, American screenwriter and producer 
 December 7 – Tino Martinez, American baseball player
 December 8 – Kotono Mitsuishi, Japanese voice actress
 December 9
 Joshua Bell, American violinist
 Caryn Kadavy, American figure skater
 December 11
 DJ Yella, American DJ and record producer
 Mo'Nique, African-American actress and comedian 
 Peter Kelamis, Australian voice actor
 December 12 – John Randle, American football player
 December 13
 Jamie Foxx, African-American actor and singer
 Yūji Oda, Japanese singer and actor
 December 14 – Hanne Haugland, Norwegian high jumper
 December 15 – Mo Vaughn, American baseball player
 December 16
 Donovan Bailey, Canadian athlete
 Miranda Otto, Australian actress
 December 17 – Gigi D'Agostino, Italian musician and DJ
 December 18
 Robert Wahlberg, American actor
 Toine van Peperstraten, Dutch sports journalist
 December 19
 Criss Angel, American musician, magician, illusionist, escapologist and stunt performer 
 Charles Austin, American Olympic athlete
 December 20 – Eugenia Cauduro, Mexican actress and model
 December 21
 Mikheil Saakashvili, Georgian politician, 3rd President of Georgia and Governor of Odessa Oblast
 Masamune Kusano, Japanese musician
 December 22
 Juan Manuel Bernal, Mexican actor
 Richey Edwards, Welsh musician (d. 1995)
 Dan Petrescu, Romanian footballer
 December 23 – Carla Bruni, Italian-French model, singer-songwriter and First Lady of France

Deaths

January

 January 3
 Mary Garden, Scottish-American opera singer (b. 1874)
 Jack Ruby, American nightclub owner and convicted criminal, best known as the murderer of Lee Harvey Oswald (b. 1911)
 January 4 – Donald Campbell, English water and land speed record seeker (b. 1921)
 January 9 – Waldo Frank, American novelist and historian (b. 1889)
 January 12 – Holland Smith, American general (b. 1882)
 January 14 – Miklós Kállay, 34th Prime Minister of Hungary (b. 1887)
 January 17
 Evelyn Nesbit, American actress and model (b. 1884)
 Barney Ross, American boxer (b. 1909)
 January 21 – Ann Sheridan, American actress (b. 1915)
 January 22 – Jobyna Ralston, American actress (b. 1899)
 January 23 – Holcombe Ward, American tennis player (b. 1878)
 January 24 – Luigi Federzoni, Italian Fascist politician (b. 1878)
 January 27
 Crew of Apollo 1 (launch pad fire):
 Ed White, American astronaut (b. 1930)
 Gus Grissom, American astronaut (b. 1926)
 Roger Chaffee, American astronaut (b. 1935)
 David Maxwell Fyfe, 1st Earl of Kilmuir, British politician, lawyer, and judge (b. 1900)
 Alphonse Juin, Marshal of France (b. 1888)
 Luigi Tenco, Italian singer-songwriter (b. 1938)
 January 28 – Leonhard Seppala, Norwegian-American sled dog breeder, trainer and musher (b. 1877)
 January 31 – Eddie Tolan, American athlete (b. 1908)

February

 February 3 – Joe Meek, English record producer and sound engineer (b. 1929)
 February 6
 Martine Carol, French actress (b. 1920)
 Henry Morgenthau Jr., United States Secretary of the Treasury during World War II (b. 1891)
 February 7 – David Unaipon, Australian author and inventor (b. 1872)
 February 8 – Victor Gollancz, British publisher (b. 1893)
 February 13 – Abelardo L. Rodríguez, substitute president of Mexico (1932-1934) (b. 1889) 
 February 14 
Forough Farrokhzad, Iranian poet, writer and filmmaker (b. 1934)
Sig Ruman, German actor (b. 1884)
 February 15 – Antonio Moreno, Spanish actor (b. 1887)
 February 16 – Smiley Burnette, American actor (b. 1911)
 February 17 – Ciro Alegría, Peruvian journalist, politician, and novelist (b. 1909)
 February 18 – J. Robert Oppenheimer, American physicist (b. 1904)
 February 21 – Charles Beaumont, American writer (b. 1929)
 February 24 – Franz Waxman, German-American composer (b. 1906)
 February 28 – Henry Luce, American publisher (b. 1898)

March

 March 2
 Gordon Harker, English actor (b. 1885)
 José Martínez Ruiz, 'Azorín', Spanish writer (b. 1873)
 March 5
 Mischa Auer, Russian-born actor (b. 1905)
 Mohammad Mosaddegh, Iranian politician, 35th Prime Minister of Iran (b. 1882)
 Georges Vanier, Canadian Governor General (b. 1888)
 March 6
 Nelson Eddy, American singer and actor (b. 1901)
 Zoltán Kodály, Hungarian composer (b. 1882)
 March 7 – Alice B. Toklas, American personality (b. 1877)
 March 11 – Geraldine Farrar, American soprano (b. 1882)
 March 23 – Pete Johnson, American boogie-woogie and jazz pianist, songwriter (b. 1904)
 March 27 – Jaroslav Heyrovský, Czech chemist, Nobel Prize laureate (b. 1890)
 March 30 – Jean Toomer, American writer (b. 1894)
 March 31
 Don Alvarado, American actor (b. 1904)
 Rodion Malinovsky, Soviet military commander and Minister of Defence (b. 1898)

April

 April 5 – Hermann Joseph Muller, American geneticist, recipient of the Nobel Prize in Physiology or Medicine (b. 1890)
 April 13 – Luis Somoza Debayle, 26th President of Nicaragua (b. 1922)
 April 15 – Totò, Italian actor (b. 1898)
 April 17 – Red Allen, American jazz trumpeter (b. 1908)
 April 18 – Friedrich Heiler, German theologian and historian (b. 1892)
 April 19 
 Konrad Adenauer, German statesman, 27th Chancellor of the Federal Republic of Germany (b. 1876)
 William Boyle, 12th Earl of Cork, British admiral of the fleet (b. 1873)
 April 22 – Tom Conway, British actor (b. 1904)
 April 23 – Edgar Neville, Spanish playwright and film director (b. 1899)
 April 24 – Vladimir Komarov, Soviet cosmonaut (b. 1927)
 April 27 – William Douglas Cook, New Zealand founder of Eastwoodhill Arboretum and Pukeiti (b. 1884)
 April 29 – Anthony Mann, American actor and director (b. 1906)

May

 May 6 – Zhou Zuoren, Chinese writer (b. 1885)
 May 7 
 Anne Bauchens, American film editor (b. 1882)
 Judith Evelyn, American actress (b. 1909)
 May 8
 Laverne Andrews, American singer (b. 1911)
 Elmer Rice, American playwright (b. 1892)
 May 10 – Lorenzo Bandini, Italian Formula One driver (b. 1935)
 May 12 – John Masefield, English poet and novelist (b. 1878)
 May 15 – Edward Hopper, American painter (b. 1882)
 May 18 – Andy Clyde, Scottish actor (b. 1892)
 May 21
 Géza Lakatos, Hungarian general and politician, 36th Prime Minister of Hungary (b. 1890)
 Rexhep Mitrovica, Albanian politician, 18th Prime Minister of Albania (b. 1888)
 May 22
 Langston Hughes, American writer, novelist, playwright, and columnist (b. 1901)
 Josip Plemelj, Slovene mathematician (b. 1873)
 May 27 
Tilly Edinger, German-born American scientist, founder of paleoneurology (b. 1897)
Johannes Itten, Swiss painter (b. 1888)
 May 29 – Georg Wilhelm Pabst, Austrian film director (b. 1885)
 May 30 – Claude Rains, British actor (b. 1889)
 May 31 – Billy Strayhorn, American composer and pianist (b. 1915)

June

 June 3 – Arthur Tedder, 1st Baron Tedder, British air force officer, Marshal of the Royal Air Force (b. 1890)
 June 5 – Arthur Biram, Israeli philosopher and educator, and Israel Prize recipient (b. 1878)
 June 6 – Edward Givens, American astronaut (b. 1930) 
 June 7 – Dorothy Parker, American writer (b. 1893)
 June 10 – Spencer Tracy, American actor (b. 1900)
 June 11 – Wolfgang Köhler, German psychologist (b. 1887)
 June 13
 Gerald Patterson, Australian tennis champion (b. 1895)
 Sir Edward Ellington, British military officer; Marshal of the Royal Air Force (b. 1877)
 June 14 – Eddie Eagan, American sportsman (b. 1897)
 June 16 – Reginald Denny, English actor (b. 1891)
 June 17 – Vernon Huber, American admiral and 36th Governor of American Samoa (b. 1899)
 June 26 – Françoise Dorléac, French actress (b. 1942)
 June 29
 Primo Carnera, Italian boxer (b. 1906)
 Jayne Mansfield, American actress (b. 1933)

July

 July 1 – Gerhard Ritter, German historian (b. 1888)
 July 8
 Fatima Jinnah, Pakistan's "Mother of the Nation" (b. 1893)
 Vivien Leigh, English actress (b. 1913)
 July 9 – Eugen Fischer, German professor of medicine, anthropology and eugenics (b. 1874)
 July 13 – Tommy Lucchese, Italian-American gangster (b. 1899)
 July 14 – Tudor Arghezi, Romanian writer (b. 1880)
 July 17
 Cyril Ring, American film actor (b. 1892)
 John Coltrane, American jazz saxophonist (b. 1926)
 July 18 – Humberto de Alencar Castelo Branco, 26th President of Brazil (plane crash) (b. 1897)
 July 19 – John T. McNaughton, United States Assistant Secretary of Defense for International Security Affairs and an advisor to Robert McNamara (plane crash) (b. 1921)
 July 20 – Lewis H. Brereton, American aviation pioneer and air force general (b. 1890)
 July 21
 Jimmie Foxx, American baseball player (Philadelphia Athletics) and member of the MLB Hall of Fame (b. 1907)
 Albert Lutuli, South African politician, recipient of the Nobel Peace Prize (b. 1898)
 Basil Rathbone, British actor (b. 1892)
 July 22 – Carl Sandburg, American poet (b. 1878)

August

 August 1
 Richard Kuhn, Austrian chemist, Nobel Prize laureate (b. 1900)
 Adrien Arcand, Canadian politician (b. 1899)
 August 2 – Walter Terence Stace, British philosopher (b. 1886)
 August 9
 Joe Orton, English playwright (b. 1933)
 Anton Walbrook, Austrian actor (b. 1896)
 August 13 – Jane Darwell, American actress (b. 1879)
 August 15
 Luis A. Eguiguren, Peruvian historian and politician (b. 1887)
 René Magritte, Belgian painter (b. 1898)
 Manuel Prado Ugarteche, 50th & 54th President of Peru (b. 1889)
 August 19
 Isaac Deutscher, British Marxist historian (b. 1907)
 Hugo Gernsback, Luxembourg-born editor and publisher (b. 1884)
 August 22 – Gregory Goodwin Pincus, American biologist and researcher (b. 1903)
 August 23 – Nathaniel Cartmell, American Olympic athlete (b. 1883)
 August 24 – Henry J. Kaiser, American industrialist (b. 1882)
 August 25
 Stanley Bruce, 8th Prime Minister of Australia (b. 1883)
 Paul Muni, American actor (b. 1895)
 George Lincoln Rockwell, American Nazi Party leader (b. 1918)
 August 27 – Brian Epstein, English band manager (The Beatles) (b. 1934)
 August 30
 Samuel Mosberg, American boxer, Olympic champion (b. 1896)
 Ad Reinhardt, American painter (b. 1913)
 August 31
 Ilya Ehrenburg, Russian writer (b. 1891)
 Mikhail Kovalyov, Soviet general (b. 1897)

September

 September 1
 James Dunn, American actor (b. 1901)
 Ilse Koch, Nazi German war criminal (b. 1906)
 Siegfried Sassoon, British poet (b. 1886)
 September 3 – Francis Ouimet, American professional golfer (b. 1893)
 September 8 – Juliusz Rómmel, Polish general (b. 1881)
 September 12 – Vladimir Bartol, Slovene author (b. 1903)
 September 13 – Varian Fry, American journalist (b. 1907)
 September 18 – John Cockcroft, English physicist, Nobel Prize laureate (b. 1897)
 September 27 – Prince Felix Yusupov, Russian assassin of Rasputin (b. 1887)
 September 29 – Carson McCullers, American writer (b. 1917)

October

 October 3
 Pinto Colvig, American actor, newspaper cartoonist and circus performer (b. 1892)
 Woody Guthrie, American folk musician (b. 1912)
 Sir Malcolm Sargent, English conductor (b. 1895)
 October 5 – Clifton Williams, American astronaut (b. 1932)
 October 7 – Sir Norman Angell, British politician, recipient of the Nobel Peace Prize (b. 1872)
 October 8 – Clement Attlee, British politician, 60th Prime Minister of the United Kingdom (b. 1883)
 October 9
 Gordon Allport, American psychologist (b. 1897)
 Che Guevara, Argentine communist revolutionary (b. 1928)
 Cyril Norman Hinshelwood, English chemist, Nobel Prize laureate (b. 1897)
 André Maurois, French author (b. 1885_
 Joseph Pilates, German physical culturist and developer of Pilates (b. 1883)
 Edith Storey, American actress (b. 1892)
 October 12 – Nat Pendleton, American actor and Olympic wrestler (b. 1895)
 October 17 – Xuantong Emperor, last Emperor of China (b. 1906)
 October 20 – Shigeru Yoshida, Japanese diplomat and politician, 32nd Prime Minister of Japan (b. 1878)
 October 21 – Ejnar Hertzsprung, Danish chemist and astronomer (b. 1873)
 October 29 – Julien Duvivier, French film director (b. 1896)
 October 30 – Charles Trowbridge, American actor (b. 1882)

November

 November 7 – John Nance Garner, 32nd Vice President of the United States (b. 1868)
 November 9 – Charles Bickford, American actor (b. 1891)
 November 13 – Harriet Cohen, English pianist (b. 1895)
 November 15 – Alice Lake, American actress (b. 1895)
 November 19 – Casimir Funk, Polish biochemist (b. 1884)
 November 21 – Florence Reed, American actress (b. 1883)
 November 25 – Ossip Zadkine, Russian sculptor, painter and lithographer (b. 1888)
 November 26 – Albert Warner, American film producer (b. 1884)
 November 28 – Léon M'ba, 1st President of Gabon (b. 1902)
 November 29 – Ferenc Münnich, 47th Prime Minister of Hungary (b. 1886)

December

 December 4
 Daniel Jones, British phonetician (b. 1881)
 Bert Lahr, American actor (b. 1895)
 December 8 – Robert Henry Lawrence Jr., American astronaut (b. 1935)
 December 10 – Otis Redding, American singer (b. 1941)
 December 11 
 Howard Freeman, American actor (b. 1899)
 Victor de Sabata, Italian conductor and composer (b. 1892)
 December 17 – Harold Holt, 17th Prime Minister of Australia (body never found) (b. 1908)
 December 21
 Stuart Erwin, American actor (b. 1903)
 Ejnar Hertzsprung, Danish chemist and astronomer (b. 1873)
 December 26 – Sydney Barnes, English cricketer (b. 1873)
 December 27 – Ferran Sunyer i Balaguer, Spanish mathematician (b. 1912)
 December 28 – Katharine McCormick, American suffragist (b. 1875)
 December 29 – Paul Whiteman, American bandleader (b. 1890)
 December 30 – Vincent Massey, Canadian Governor General (b. 1887)

Date unknown
 Fathollah Khan Akbar, Iranian cabinet minister, 17th Prime Minister of Iran (b. 1878)

Nobel Prizes

 Physics – Hans Bethe
 Chemistry – Manfred Eigen, Ronald George Wreyford Norrish, George Porter
 Physiology or Medicine – Ragnar Granit, Haldan Keffer Hartline, George Wald
 Literature – Miguel Ángel Asturias
 Peace – not awarded

References

Sources
 1967 – Headlines A report from Michael Wallace of WCBS Newsradio 880 (WCBS-AM New York) Part of WCBS 880's celebration of 40 years of newsradio.
 1967 – The Year in Sound An Audiofile produced by Lou Zambrana of WCBS Newsradio 880 (WCBS-AM New York) Part of WCBS 880's celebration of 40 years of newsradio.
 Everything you want to know about the Expo 67